Dalibor Stevanović (born 27 September 1984) is a Slovenian professional football coach and a former player. He is an assistant head coach for the Swiss Challenge League club Stade Lausanne Ouchy.

Career
In January 2009, Stevanović signed a contract with Vitesse Arnhem.

International
Dalibor Stevanović earned his first cap for Slovenia team in a 1–0 victory against Cyprus team in February 2006. He scored his first goal for Slovenia on 14 October 2009 in a 2010 World Cup qualifying match against San Marino.

International goal
Scores and results list Slovenia's goal tally first.

See also
Slovenian international players

References

External links

Player profile at NZS 

 

1984 births
Living people
Slovenian people of Serbian descent
Footballers from Ljubljana
Slovenian footballers
Association football midfielders
NK Domžale players
Real Sociedad footballers
Deportivo Alavés players
La Liga players
Maccabi Petah Tikva F.C. players
FC Volyn Lutsk players
SBV Vitesse players
Śląsk Wrocław players
FC Torpedo Moscow players
FC Mordovia Saransk players
NK Slaven Belupo players
Servette FC players
FC Stade Nyonnais players
Slovenian PrvaLiga players
Eredivisie players
Ukrainian Premier League players
Ekstraklasa players
Russian Premier League players
Croatian Football League players
Swiss Challenge League players
Swiss Promotion League players
Slovenian expatriate footballers
Expatriate footballers in the Netherlands
Expatriate footballers in Spain
Expatriate footballers in Ukraine
Expatriate footballers in Israel
Expatriate footballers in Poland
Expatriate footballers in Russia
Expatriate footballers in Croatia
Expatriate footballers in Switzerland
Slovenian expatriate sportspeople in the Netherlands
Slovenian expatriate sportspeople in Spain
Slovenian expatriate sportspeople in Ukraine
Slovenian expatriate sportspeople in Israel
Slovenian expatriate sportspeople in Poland
Slovenian expatriate sportspeople in Russia
Slovenian expatriate sportspeople in Croatia
Slovenian expatriate sportspeople in Switzerland
Slovenia youth international footballers
Slovenia under-21 international footballers
2010 FIFA World Cup players
Slovenia international footballers